Bächli is a Swiss German surname meaning little stream. Notable people with the surname include:

Hubert Bächli (born 1938), Swiss cyclist
Silvia Bächli (born 1956), Swiss visual artist
Ulrich Bächli (born 1950), Swiss bobsledder

German-language surnames
Surnames of Swiss origin